Cassia National Forest was established as the Cassia Forest Reserve in Idaho by the U.S. Forest Service on June 12, 1905 with . It became a National Forest on March 4, 1907. On July 1, 1908 it was combined with Raft River National Forest to establish Minidoka National Forest, when the name was discontinued. The land is now part of Sawtooth National Forest.

References

External links
Forest History Society
Listing of the National Forests of the United States and Their Dates (from the Forest History Society website) Text from Davis, Richard C., ed. Encyclopedia of American Forest and Conservation History. New York: Macmillan Publishing Company for the Forest History Society, 1983. Vol. II, pp. 743-788.

Former National Forests of Idaho